General Midi (born Paul Crossman) is an English breakbeat DJ. In an undated online interview, Crossman named Al Watson as a writing partner and engineer, who also works with him in the duo Starecase. He now works as a teacher in Lampton School in London.

General Midi has released several singles on breaks labels including TCR and DJ Hyper. He released his debut album titled Midi Style on Distinct'ive Records in October 2005, and a follow-up, Operation Overdrive in 2009.

General Midi provided an hour-long guest mix and accompanying interview for Annie Nightingale's late night breaks show during the promotion of Operation Overdrive in 2009. During the interview, Annie and General Midi discussed the use of non-sampled specifically recorded vocals used throughout Operation Overdrive (this being a rare feature in breakbeat music at the time).

General Midi has received considerable play on Pandora Radio, where he is noted as having 31K listeners and 16 albums.

References

External links
General Midi's website

DJs from London
Living people
Breakbeat musicians
Electronic dance music DJs
Year of birth missing (living people)
Musicians from Bristol